Macrolepidoptera is a group within the insect order Lepidoptera. Traditionally used for the larger butterflies and moths as opposed to the "microlepidoptera", this group is artificial. However, it seems that by moving some taxa about, a monophyletic macrolepidoptera can be easily achieved.  The two superfamilies Geometroidea and Noctuoidea account for roughly one-quarter of all known Lepidoptera.

Taxonomy
In the reformed macrolepidoptera, the following superfamilies are included:
 Mimallonoidea – sack bearers
 Lasiocampoidea – lappet moths
 Bombycoidea – bombycoid moths
 Noctuoidea – owlet moths
 Drepanoidea – drepanids
 Geometroidea – inchworms
 Axioidea – European gold moths
 Calliduloidea – Old World butterfly-moths
 Hedyloidea – New World butterfly-moths (or moth-butterflies)
 Papilionoidea – true butterflies

The last two make up the Rhopalocera, or butterflies.

More recent molecular studies have failed to recover the macrolepidoptera as a monophyletic group, but have found a well supported clade of moths that excludes the butterflies and some other moth superfamilies. This macro-moth clade, named Macroheterocera, contains the following five or six superfamilies:

 Mimallonoidea – sack bearers (sometimes included in basal position)
 Drepanoidea – drepanids
 Noctuoidea – owlet moths
 Geometroidea – inchworms
 Lasiocampoidea – lappet moths
 Bombycoidea – bombycoid moths

References

External links

 

 
Protostome unranked clades